Amadu is a given name and surname. Notable people with the name include:

Given name:
John Amadu Bangura (1920–1970), the acting Governor-General of Sierra Leone from 18 April to 22 April 1968
Alfred Amadu Conteh, African American sculptor, painter and mixed-media artist
Amadu Diallo, 23-year-old US immigrant from Guinea shot and killed by four plain-clothed police officers
Amadu Jalloh, politician in Sierra Leone
Yulisa Pat Amadu Maddy (born 1936), Sierra Leonean actor, dancer, director and playwright
Tejan Amadu Mansaray, Sierra Leonean politician
Amadu II of Masina (1845–1853), ruler of the nineteenth-century Massina Empire in what is now Mali
Amadu III of Masina (1830–1862), the last ruler of the Fula Massina Empire in what is now the Mopti Region of Mali
Amadu Sulley, Ghanaian public official
Amadu Turé (born 1993), Guinea-Bissauan footballer
Amadu Wurie (1898–1977), early Sierra Leonean educationist and politician
Moses Amadu Yahaya, Ghanaian building technician, politician and Member of Parliament
Amadu Yusufu (born 1958), Malawian former cyclist

Surname:
Latif Amadu (born 1993), Ghanaian professional footballer
Mamood Amadu (born 1972), football player from Ghana
Seku Amadu (1773–1845), founder of the Fula Massina Empire in what is now the Mopti Region of Mali

See also
Amadu's Jihad
Amadou (name)
Ahmadlu (disambiguation)
Ahmadu (disambiguation)
Amadeu